The Reformed Church is a church in Zalău, Romania, completed in 1907.

Gallery

References

External links
 Zalău, Reformed church
 Református templom

Religion in Zalău
Reformed churches in Romania
Monuments and memorials in Zalău
Churches completed in 1907
Churches in Sălaj County
Historic monuments in Sălaj County